Bornholm Airport  is a Danish airport located 2.7 nautical miles (5 km) southeast of Rønne, on the island of Bornholm. The airport is operated by Statens Luftfartsvæsen (The Danish Civil Aviation Administration) with the air traffic control provided by Naviair.

History

In 1935, representatives of Rigsdagen, Rønne municipality and Det Danske Luftfartsselskab (DDL) − later a part of Scandinavian Airlines System − agreed to establish an air connection between Rønne and Copenhagen. The following year A/S Den bornholmske Flyveplads was founded, with airport construction beginning in 1937. Two years later the first route commenced on a temporary licence from the air transport inspectorate. Flights were however suspended after several days due to runway problems. The airport was officially opened on 16 November 1940, with DDL operating a daily route to Copenhagen. The first temporary terminal was erected shortly after, in 1941, however it wasn't until 1961 that the proper terminal building was built. In 1947 the Danish state took control over the airport, changing its name to Rønne Airport. The name of the airport was changed again in 1992, this time to Bornholm Airport in order to facilitate its marketing as a holiday destination.

In 1982, the operations were taken over by Maersk Air, later a part of Sterling Airlines. Heavy losses of the former forced it to abandon the route in 2002, which was then taken over by Cimber Air. In 2005 Danish Air Transport became the second carrier at Bornholm Airport, increasing competition on the route. The airline decided to abandon the Copenhagen–Bornholm route in 2008, but took it up again after the bankruptcy of Cimber Sterling in 2012.

Airlines and destinations

The following airlines operate regular scheduled and charter flights at the airport:

Statistics

See also
 List of the largest airports in the Nordic countries

References

AIP Denmark: Bornholm/Roenne - EKRN
VFR Flight Guide Denmark: Bornholm/Roenne - EKRN

External links

Bornholm Airport 
Bornholms Lufthavn 
Official airport webcam

Airports in Denmark
Airport
Rønne
Airports established in 1940
1940 establishments in Denmark
International airports in Denmark